Tessa Oudejans (born 21 October 1991) is a Dutch former football midfielder, who played for FC Utrecht and ADO Den Haag of the Eredivisie.

She was a member of the Dutch national team.

References

External links
 
 Profile at OnsOranje 

1991 births
Living people
Dutch women's footballers
Netherlands women's international footballers
People from Haarlemmermeer
Eredivisie (women) players
FC Utrecht (women) players
ADO Den Haag (women) players
Women's association football midfielders
Women's association football forwards
Footballers from North Holland
21st-century Dutch women